Business Plus was a 24-hour business news channel with hourly updates from the Karachi Stock Exchange. It is owned by the Karachi Stock Exchange Listed Media Times PLC (Formerly Total Media Solutions Company). Media Times PLC was owned by former Governor of Punjab and Pakistan Peoples Party stalwart Salmaan Taseer.

References

See also
List of Pakistani television stations

2018 disestablishments in Pakistan
24-hour television news channels in Pakistan
Business-related television channels
Television channels and stations established in 2004
Television stations in Karachi
Television stations in Pakistan
Business-related television channels in Pakistan
English-language television stations in Pakistan